The Mighty Celt is a 2005 drama film set in Northern Ireland, written and directed by Pearse Elliott. It stars Gillian Anderson, Robert Carlyle, Sean McGinley, Ken Stott and Tyrone McKenna. It is centred on greyhound racing in a Catholic community after the intercommunal "Troubles" have ended but where their legacy remains strong. The film was well received in Ireland, with Gillian Anderson receiving an IFTA Award for Best International Actress. The film's title is based on the name of a comic book shown in the movie.

The greyhound scenes were filmed at Ballyskeagh Greyhound track.

Reception
On review aggregator website Rotten Tomatoes, the film has an 67% approval rating based on 6 reviews, with an average ranking of 5.7/10.

William Thomas of Empire wrote "There's promise in the bursts of dark humour, but these are few and far between, only serving to remind us how much better directors like Ken Loach have dealt with the coming-of-age genre".

References

External links

The Mighty Celt at the British Films Catalogue

British drama films
Northern Irish films
Irish drama films
Films set in Northern Ireland
2005 drama films
Films and television featuring Greyhound racing
Greyhound racing films
2000s English-language films
2000s British films